LeeLee (born 12 February 1989 in Virginia, US) is an American singer.

LeeLee began singing at a young age with her local church choir. She went on to audition for the top performing arts academy in Las Vegas, Nevada, which produced such talent as pop artist Ne-Yo, and Rutina Wesley.

After her first year of attending Las Vegas Academy, LeeLee’s hard work and dedication awarded her a prime position of the academy’s top choir.  She followed this by joining the dance team, which awarded her the opportunity to travel along the East Coast of the US.

LeeLee received her first break into the music industry after being invited to record vocals for Baby Bash where she met producer, Jimmy Klev.

After recording, Klev signed her to his production company El Mariachis, then signed with Universal in the UK. She moved to London, and there completed a four-year music tour, performing at clubs, radio stations, sport arenas, resorts, and on television.

Singles
(2011) Boombada
(2012) Looks Good On You (feat. JimmyKlev)
(2012) Ugly

References

External links
 LeeLee's official website
 'Boombada' single video
 Fanshake Profile

1989 births
Living people
21st-century American singers
21st-century American women singers